A bargirl is a woman who is paid to entertain patrons in a bar, either individually or, in some cases, as a performer. The exact nature of the entertainment varies widely from place to place; depending on the venue this can be individual entertainment ranging from light conversation to sexual services, or more public entertainment in the form of go-go dancing or striptease. Variants on the term include "B-girl", "hostess", and "juicy girl".

Bargirls work in various types of bars throughout the world, including strip clubs and regular bars in the U.S., hostess bars in East Asia, go-go bars and "beer bars" in Southeast Asia, dance bars in India, and boliches in Argentina.

A bargirl should not be confused with a barmaid, who serves drinks in a bar but is not expected to entertain customers individually or to dance.

Forms of entertainment provided

In addition to entertaining customers individually, bargirls also dance on stage in some venues such as strip clubs in the United States and go-go bars in Asia. Bargirls often wear bikinis or other revealing costumes for dancing, or they may dance partially or fully nude.

Methods of payment
Bargirls often receive a commission on drinks bought by their customers. Where applicable, they may receive a percentage of the escort fee or bar fine paid by any customer who wishes to take them out of the bar. In other cases, they may have a periodic quota of drinks or bar fines, or both.

Bargirl prostitution in Africa 

Screening carried out in the 1990s in Malawi indicated that about 80 per cent of bargirls carried the HIV virus. Research carried out at the time indicated that economic necessity was a major consideration in engaging and persisting in sex work.

Bargirl prostitution in Asia 

In the popular cultures of East Asia in the twentieth century, the bar girl and teahouse girl became archetypical characters associated with prostitution, replacing the traditional courtesan in that role. In postwar Japan, bar girls were to be found in the jazz clubs which provided a place for US servicemen and prostitues to meet. During the Vietnam War, a system of military-endorsed prostitution allowed bar girls to provide sexual services to US servicemen. In the Philippines, the role of bar girl has become stereotyped and stigmatised due to its association with prostitution and the US military.

It is a common practice in Asia for bargirls to also act as prostitutes, either on-site (with the bar effectively acting as a brothel) or by being hired upon payment of a bar fine. In South Korea, "juicy bars" near the gates of United States military bases provide prostitutes for soldiers. Prostitution has been illegal in South Korea since 2004, and since 2005 the Uniform Code of Military Justice has prohibited US military personnel from buying the services of prostitutes, with bars and clubs suspected of being venues for prostitution being declared "off-limits" for military personnel.

In Japan an "entertainers visa" was introduced in 1981 allowing migrant Filipina women to work in Japanese nightclubs. The work included dancing in strip shows, socialising with male guests, and in some cases prostitution.

In countries such as Thailand, where bargirl prostitution is common, it is technically illegal but widely tolerated. Bargirls in Thailand are usually self-employed, deriving their income from dancing, persuading bar customers to buy drinks, and prostitution. Where bargirls work as prostitutes, they may take multiple "short time" clients or accept "long-time" clients overnight or for a few days.

Bar fines
A "bar fine" is a payment made by a customer to the operators of a bar that allows a dancer, hostess, or some other employee of that bar to leave work early, usually in order to accompany the customer outside the bar. The bar fine is usually kept by the bar in lieu of lost income, but in some larger bar chains the bargirl may receive a portion of the bar fine, with much of the remainder being used to pay for STD and HIV testing for the bargirls. Although it is not universal, this practice is frequently associated with venues offering prostitution to foreigners—especially in Southeast Asian countries such as Thailand and the Philippines.

Working conditions
Working conditions vary both among and within countries; even within individual countries, conditions can vary widely between venues. For example, there is significant variation among establishments in Thailand's red-light district in Pattaya. Some bars employ relatively well-paid women who live outside the bar, while others employ lower-paid women who live at the bar.

"B-girl activity" in the United States

In the United States, B-girls (an abbreviation of bar girls) were women who were paid to converse with male patrons and encourage them to buy them both drinks. The drinks were often watered down or non-alcoholic to minimize the effects of the alcohol on the B-girls and reduce the cost to the bar. B-girls originated in nightclubs and were employed by bars in the US during the 1940s and 1950s. They were scantily clad and often worked as female escorts rather than performers. In her memoirs Maya Angelou describes working as a B-girl in a San Francisco strip club in the 1950s.

B-girl activity has declined in the U.S. but it still occurs. Because prostitution is illegal in most parts of the U.S. and is restricted to licensed brothels in those parts of Nevada where it is legal, B-girls who act as prostitutes are breaking the law. The practice of accepting drinks for pay is specifically outlawed in many localities.

Bars have been raided and closed down for "B-girl activity". In one 1962 case, nightclub owners suspected of having ties to a Chicago crime syndicate were brought before the Senate Rackets Committee. The Boston Globe reported that "one of [the syndicate's] rackets, according to testimony, is the operation of cheap nightclubs which use B-girls to solicit watered-down drinks at high prices from customers, or even engage in prostitution with them."

It was once common for modestly dressed B-girls to pose as secretaries who had stopped at the bar for a drink on their way home from work. The male customer, under the impression that he had found a "date" for the evening, would buy her one expensive drink after another, only to be jilted afterwards.

A 1984 report by the US Internal Revenue Service described bar girls soliciting for prostitution in bars, hotels and restaurants. The report said that they earned more for sex work than streetwalkers and typically offered more varied services. Bar girls sometimes paid commission to the establishment where they worked. In some cases they used hotel rooms for sex, typically provided by the hotel management or by a client. The report suggested that police attempts to suppress the activity by arresting bar girls had rarely been successful.

In 2014, city officials in Kenner, Louisiana (a suburb of New Orleans), where the practice is illegal, replaced the word "B-girl" with "B-drinker" in their liquor laws to avoid gender discrimination.

In popular culture
 Marilyn Monroe was nominated for a Golden Globe award for her role as a B-girl in Bus Stop (1956). In the film, Monroe's character, Chérie, consumes four tea-and-sodas before her companion catches on.

 Darlene, a character in John Kennedy Toole's A Confederacy of Dunces, works as a B-girl in the Night of Joy bar.

 In the M*A*S*H season four episode "Deluge" Hawkeye tells Father Mulcahy: "You look just like a 'B' girl I knew in San Diego". Father Mulcahy jokingly responds that "It's quite possible. I worked my way through divinity school as a 'B' girl in San Diego".

 In the television film Young Indiana Jones and the Treasure of the Peacock's Eye, Indiana Jones (Sean Patrick Flanery) becomes involved with a woman named Lily (Jayne Ashbourne). When they first meet, Lily is working as a bargirl on the island of Java. They meet again, after Lily's had all her money taken from her, placed on a ship and told to never come back (implied to have been kicked out of town for prostitution).

See also
 Jilt shop
 It girl
 Lap dance
 Meshimori onna
 Prostitution in Thailand
 Table dance
 Taxi dancer

Notes

References

External links
  Hope In Heaven documentary
 Painted Ladies of the Old West

Prostitutes by type
Food services occupations
Sales occupations
Gendered occupations